Pyotr Fyodorovich Lysenko, (16 September 1931, in Zarechany, Polotsk district, Vitebsk Region, Belarus – 23 March 2020) was a Belarusian archaeologist, Doctor of History (since 1988), professor (since 1993).

He was the author of over 110 scientific works, several monographs. His most famous work is the discovery of the ancient  Berestye and establishment of the Berestye Archeological Museum.

Lysenko died on 23 March 2020.

Writings 
 “Древнейшие города Белоруссии” (Ancient Towns of Byelorussia). Minsk, 1966. (as a co-author with G.V.Shtykhov) (in Russian)
 “Города Туровской земли” (Towns of Turov Land). Minsk, (1974) (in Russian)
 “Берестье” (Berestye). Minsk, (1985) (in Russian)
 “Отрытие Берестья” (The Discovery of Berestye). Minsk, (1989); (2007) second edition  (in Russian)
 “Дреговичи” (Dregovichy). Minsk, (1991) (in Russian)
 “Древний Пинск IX — XIII вв” (Ancient Pinsk of the 9th–13th centuries). Minsk, (1997); Pinsk, (2007) second edition  (in Russian)
 “Туровская земля IX — XIII вв” (Turov Land of the 9th–13th centuries). Minsk, (1999) 985-08-0096-8; (2001) second edition  (in Russian)
 “Древний Туров” (Ancient Turov). Minsk, (2004)  (in Russian)
 “Сказание о Турове” (Story about Turov). Minsk, (2006) ; 2007 second edition  (in Russian)

References

Further reading

External links
an article  about P.F.Lysenko’s 80th anniversary (in Russian) in Vecherniy Brest of 16.09.2011

1931 births
2020 deaths
Belarusian archaeologists
Maxim Tank Belarusian State Pedagogical University alumni